Heydon's Case (1584) 76 ER 637 is considered a landmark case: it was the first case to use what would come to be called the mischief rule of statutory interpretation. The mischief rule is more flexible than the golden or literal rule, in that the mischief rule requires judges to look over four tasks to ensure that gaps within the law are covered.

Facts of the case
This is a construction of leases, life estates, and statutes.

Ottery College, a religious college, gave a tenancy in a manor also called Ottery to a man, Ware, and his son, also referred to as Ware. They are referred to in the case report as "Ware the father and Ware the son".

The tenancy was established by copyhold. Ware and his son held their copyhold for their lives, subject to the will of the lord and the custom of the manor. The Wares’ copyhold was part of a parcel also occupied by some tenants at will. Later, the college leased the same parcel to another man, named Heydon, for a period of eighty years, in return for rents equal to the traditional rent for the components of the parcel.

Less than a year after the parcel had been leased to Heydon, Parliament enacted the Suppression of Religious Houses Act 1535 (Act of Dissolution). The statute had the effect of dissolving many religious colleges, including Ottery College, which lost its lands and rents to Henry VIII. However, a provision in the Act kept in force, for a term of life, any grants that had been made more than a year before the enactment of the statute.

The Court of Exchequer found that the grant to the Wares was protected by the relevant provision of the Act of Dissolution, but that the lease to Heydon was void.

Significance of the case
The ruling was based on an important discussion of the relationship of a statute to the pre-existing common law. The court concluded that the purpose of the statute was to cure a mischief resulting from a defect in the common law. Therefore, the court concluded, the remedy of the statute was limited to curing that defect. Judges are supposed to construe statutes by seeking the true intent of the makers of the Act, which is presumed to be pro bono publico, or intent for the public good.

Lord Coke described the process through which the court must interpret legislation:

See also
Constitution of the United Kingdom
Common law
Re Spectrum Plus Ltd
AG of Belize v Belize Telecom

Notes

References

External links
Full text from BAILII.org
Text of judgment from Libertyfund.org

1584 in English law
1584 in England
English interpretation case law
Edward Coke cases
Exchequer of Pleas cases